The South Yemen insurgency is a term used by the Yemeni government to describe the protests and attacks on government forces in southern Yemen, ongoing since 27 April 2009. Although the violence has been blamed on elements within the southern secessionist movement, leaders of the group maintain that their aims of independence are to be achieved through peaceful means, and claim that attacks are from ordinary citizens in response to the government's provocative actions. The insurgency comes amid the Shia insurgency in the country's north as led by the Houthi communities. Southern leaders led a brief, unsuccessful secession in 1994 following unification. Many of them are involved in the present secession movement. Southern separatist insurgents are active mainly in the area of former South Yemen, but also in Ad Dali' Governorate, which was not a part of the independent southern state. They are supported by the United Arab Emirates, even though the UAE is a member of the Saudi Arabian-led coalition working to support the Yemeni government under President Abdrabbuh Mansur Hadi.

Insurgents
The political movement behind the so-called 'insurgency' is a group called the Southern Movement. Led by exiled South Yemeni leaders and opposition figures, this group calls for peaceful protests. However, their protests have recently often turned into riots, some with armed fighters. The insurgency has occasionally been linked by the Yemeni government to Islamist groups, including ex-military commanders and South-Yemeni tribes. South Yemen is home to several jihadist movements, some of which are believed to be affiliated with al-Qaeda, most notably a group called the Aden-Abyan Islamic Army. Naser al-Wahishi the leader of al-Qaeda in the Arabian Peninsula expressed support for the South Yemeni separatist movement. However leaders of the Southern Movement were quick to deny any links with al-Qaeda. Many believe that Saleh's government is using al-Qaeda as a means to win international support against insurgencies in the North and South. As a response to such accusations, Tariq al-Fadhli - one of the leaders of the southern movement - posted a video of himself on YouTube raising the American flag with the national anthem over his compound in an attempt to openly distance himself from Al-Qaeda.

There are many leaders within the movement, including Fadi Hassan Ahmed Baoum who is head of the Southern Movement's Supreme Council. He was arrested and later released by Yemeni authorities. Meanwhile, Tahir Tamah has been said to be behind the group's militant faction.

Timeline

2009–2011 insurgency
2009
April 2009
28 April 2009, 14 people are injured and 1 soldier is killed as separatist militants attack a checkpoint in Mukalla; this was the 7th soldier to be killed in South Yemen secessionist violence.
May 2009
3 May 2009, one man is killed and 4 are injured in a bomb blast carried out by separatist militia.
4 May 2009, armed South-Yemeni protesters ambushed a military base in the south, killing 1 soldier.
June 2009
8 June 2009, 2 people were killed and 4 were wounded during protests in the South, bringing total casualties to 11 soldiers and 11 others killed.
July 2009
25 July 2009, 1 person was killed and 4 injured as protesters clash with police in Dhaleh.
28 July 2009, 4 Yemeni soldiers are killed as armed men attack a government checkpoint in the south. It was said supporters of Tareq al-Fadhli, an Islamist leader who called for protests in response for the death of 16 people at a separatist rally, were responsible
October 2009
25 October 2009, gunmen ambushed a vehicle carrying the body of a soldier killed in Sa'dah, the ambush kills 2 soldiers and injures 3.
November 2009
1 November 2009, armed rebels attack the headquarters of security corps in Abyan Governorate, killing 1 soldier and kidnapping  Deputy Governor of Abyan, Adel Hamoud al-Sabri.
2010
January 2010
24 January 2010, in the southern province of Shabwa, in Yemen, three members of Yemen's security forces were killed after an attack on a checkpoint.
25 January 2010, during riots, one policeman was killed while 11 policemen and 3 school children were injured.
27 January 2010, separatists shoot dead a policeman in Al-Ghaydah.
February 2010
1–24 February 2010, government crackdown arrests 130 separatists in South Yemen.
13 February 2010, Riots in al-Hawta city, Lahij province left one dead and 7 injured. According to Hawta security director Ali Ammar: "Separatist elements blocked the roads, opened fire randomly and hurled a grenade at a security patrol, killing a citizen and injuring others."
17 February 2010, Tareq al-Fadhli announced that starting on 20 February, the next phase of the South Yemeni uprising would begin with mass protests and civil disobedience campaign. The man who died was a protester and another 5 protesters were arrested. However, in a separate clashes armed separatists killed a soldier and wounded three in Shabwa province.
20 February 2010, separatists kill the director of a criminal investigations unit and one of his guards in an ambush on a government convoy, another three people were injured. In a separate incident clashes erupted between security forces and gunmen in al-Dalea.
22 February 2010, Faris al-Dhama, a South Yemeni activist is arrested and killed by the Yemeni government.
23 February 2010, a soldier is killed by armed separatists in Dhale Province 
26 February 2010, a soldier is killed in an ambush in the Abyan province.
27 February 2010, Yemen declares state of emergency in southern Yemen. This decision follows a rise in attacks against soldiers.
March 2010
1 March 2010, Southern Yemeni activist, accused of links with Al-Qaeda, his wife, son and daughter and two policemen were killed in an armed attack against his home. Another policemen was wounded. In a second time over 19 people were killed in a bombing in the city of Ta'izz.
11 March 2010, two militants were killed and 10 others wounded in clashes with police. 6 policemen were also wounded.
April 2010
1 April 2010, an argument between inmates from the separatist Movement for the Independence of Southern Yemen and guards resulted in a bomb being thrown and up to forty inmates escaping in Daleh. Four were reported injured.
15 April 2010, two militants were wounded during a riot after a demonstration in the city of Daleh.
June 2010
4 June 2010,  a Yemeni colonel and two of his bodyguards were killed in an attack.
20 June 2010, two officers were killed in an ambush in the province of Dali.
23 June 2010, three soldiers were killed in fighting in Dhaleh province.
24 June 2010, three soldiers and a civilian were killed, and eight others wounded in clashes in Dhaleh province.
25 June 2010, one Southern Movement separatist was killed by security forces in Aden after a firefight erupted during anti-government protests.
July 2010
7 July 2010, two demonstrators died and four were injured when police attempted to break up anti-government protest in Aden.
27 July 2010, separatists ambushed a security patrol in Lahij, killing four soldiers and wounding nine others.
September 2010
5 September 2010, Two people were killed and seven others were injured Sunday in clashes between security forces and militants in Lahij governorate in southern Yemen.
December 2010
17 December 2010, clashes killed four Yemeni soldiers and an army officer after soldiers shot dead a Southern Movement member, Abbas Tanbaj, in Habilain in Lahij governorate. Eight additional people are reported wounded, including five soldiers, two militants, and a civilian.
2011
January 2011
8 January 2011, Southern Movement militants attacked a checkpoint in al Malah district in Lahij governorate. At last two soldiers were killed and another was injured in the attack.
10 January 2011, clashes in Lahij governorate killed at last two soldiers.
12 January 2011, fighting between southern separatists and soldiers in Lahij governorate killed four Yemeni soldiers and wounded ten others.
13 January 2011, southern Movement supporters demonstrated in Mukallah in Hadramawt governorate demanding that detained militants be released. One militant was killed and two others were wounded.
16 January 2011, one woman was killed and seven civilians were wounded in Habilain in Lahij governorate during fighting. The army reported that four of its soldiers were wounded during the clashes.

2011 Yemeni revolution

24 February 2011, at least one civilian was killed during a Southern Movement protest in the city of Lawder in Abyan governorate.
28 March 2011, in Shabwa the Southern Movement attacked and looted Central Security camps, taking control of Nessab, Al-Saaed, Haban and Maefaa districts of the governorate.
4 April 2011, southern separatists stormed military checkpoints in the southern governorate of Lahij. The clashes left one soldier dead and five soldiers wounded.
20 April 2011, gunmen attacked security forces at a protest in Khormaksar city in Aden governorate, killing one soldier and wounding at least four other people. Some witnesses report that the gunmen were connected to the Southern Movement.
10 June 2011, suspected Southern Movement militants attacked a military checkpoint outside al Habilain in Lahij governorate. At least five soldiers and three rebels were killed.
16 June 2011, gunmen linked with the Southern Movement shot and killed two Yemeni soldiers in Lahij governorate.
24 June 2011, at least three soldiers and a passerby were killed in an attack led by South Yemen militants in al Mansoura. A famous Southern separatist leader Jeyab al Saadi was killed when security forces opened fire on the funeral procession in Aden.

1 July 2011, an armed militant from the Southern Movement was killed in an attack on an army position in Aden. Six others, including three soldiers, were injured in the clash.
9 July 2011, Southern Movement was blamed for an ambush against a security patrol killing a Yemeni army officer and two troops.  Two civilians were also wounded in the attack.
23 August 2011, armed tribesmen backed by the Southern Movement captured a prison in Lahj. Government forces were unable to counter the heavy fire and surrendered. Over 20 prisoners were freed.

Post-Revolution (2012)
The southern movement, like the Houthis rejected a GCC brokered deal between the GPC and Al-Islah and boycotted the February 21, 2012 presidential election leaving Abdrabbuh Mansur Hadi as only candidate.

2013

2014

17 January 2014, Clashes between Yemeni troops and secessionist militants killed four people Friday in southern Yemen, two of them soldiers, sources on both sides said. The fighting broke out when the militants ambushed a military vehicle, killing the soldiers and wounding four others, a military source told AFP.
30 January 2014, two soldiers were among four people killed when the army clashed with separatists in Daleh in south Yemen. Southern Movement activists ambushed an army vehicle at dawn with automatic fire, killing two soldiers. Also were killed two attackers and seven more wounded in a subsequent firefight.
An activist with Southern Movement confirmed the clash, saying the attackers belonged to the militant Southern Resistance group.

5 February 2014, unidentified gunmen shot dead four Yemeni soldiers an attack on a military vehicle in the southern Shabwah Governorate. They opened fire as the vehicle headed to an army checkpoint near the port of Balhaf gas-export terminal.
7 February 2014, four soldiers killed and many wounded when Yemeni tribesmen ambushed a military convoy accompanying  technicians repairmen which were sent to repair an oil pipeline that was blown up by tribal militias in the restive southeastern Hadhramaut Governorate.
18 February 2014, Yemen's Ministry of Defense said that nine people were killed in clashes between armed men and Yemeni soldiers in the southern city of Dalea. Including four soldiers and one officer were killed in the clashes. Also fourteen other soldiers were kidnapped.
9 March 2014, At least two Yemeni soldiers and four militants were killed in a clash on Saturday when fighters tried to attack a military compound in southern Yemen.
7 August 2014, military and local officials said that eleven militants and four Yemeni soldiers were killed in attacks on two army posts in the southeastern Hadramawt province.

2015

2016

2017
In the end of April 2017, Governor of the Aden Governorate Aidarus al-Zoubaidi was sacked by President Abdrabbuh Mansur Hadi, with the reason of disloyalty to him, and loyalty to the Southern Movement. On 3 May 2017, major rallies were held in Aden to protest the decision of Hadi. One week later, Southern Transitional Council was formed, and some of the members were the governors of Dhale, Shabwah, Hadhramaut, Lahij, Socotra, and Al Mahrah governorates. It also have partial control in Abyan and Aden governorates. One day later, Hadi rejected the council, and called it illegitimate.

2018
28 January 2018 – Beginning of the Battle of Aden (2018) between the Yemeni Government and the Southern Transitional Council (STC)
30 January 2018 – STC conquers Aden

2019
29 August 2019 – the Southern Transitional Council take control of Aden and Zinjibar.

2022
7 August 2022 – the STC started an offensive in the Ayban province.

See also
2011 Yemeni protests
List of modern conflicts in the Middle East
Southern Movement

References

External links
Demystifying Yemen's Conflict (Midwest Diplomacy)
Timeline: Yemen (BBC)
YEMEN: The conflict in Saada Governorate – analysis, IRIN, 24 July 2008

Arab separatism
Rebellions in Yemen
Wars involving Yemen
Separatism in Yemen
Conflicts in 2010
Conflicts in 2011
Conflicts in 2012
Conflicts in 2013
Conflicts in 2014
National security in Yemen
2009 in Yemen
2010s in Yemen
Conflicts in 2009
Conflicts in 2015
Yemeni Crisis (2011–present)